Jan van Houwelingen (born 12 January 1955 in Heesselt, Gelderland) is a retired road bicycle racer from the Netherlands, who was a professional rider from 1979 to 1987. His older brother Adri (born 1953) was also a professional cyclist in the 1980s. In 1978, Van Houwelingen was a member of the team that won the team time trial at the 1978 UCI Road World Championships.

Teams
1979: Lano - Boule d'Or (Belgium)
1980: Boule d'Or (Belgium)
1981: Boule d'Or (Belgium)
1982: Vermeer Thijs (Belgium)
1983: Boule d'Or (Belgium)
1984: Kwantum Hallen - Yoko (Netherlands)
1985: Verandalux - Dries (Belgium)
1986: Skala - Skil (Netherlands)
1987: Transvemij - Van Schilt (Netherlands)

Tour de France
1981 – 99th
1983 – 80th
1985 – 104th

References
 

1955 births
Living people
Dutch male cyclists
People from Neerijnen
UCI Road World Champions (elite men)
UCI Road World Championships cyclists for the Netherlands
Cyclists from Gelderland
20th-century Dutch people
21st-century Dutch people